Jennifer Getzinger (born September 26, 1967) is an American director and script supervisor of film and television.

For much of her career she worked as a script supervisor on a number of notable films including The Prophecy (1995), Phantoms (1998), Clay Pigeons (1998), Requiem for a Dream (2000), and The Devil Wears Prada (2006). She was also script supervisor for the television series Strangers with Candy, Sex and the City, The Comeback, The Sopranos, and Mad Men, making her episodic directorial debut on the latter series. She has been nominated for three Directors Guild of America Awards for directing the Mad Men episodes "The Gypsy and the Hobo" (season 3, episode 11; 2009), "The Suitcase" (season 4, episode 7; 2010), and "A Little Kiss" (season 5, episodes 1 & 2; 2012).

Her other television directing credits include Hung, The Killing, Orange is the New Black, Agent Carter, How to Get Away with Murder, Shut Eye, Jessica Jones, Outlander, Counterpart, Daredevil, Westworld, Dead To Me, Why Women Kill, Outer Range, and The Nevers. In 1998, she directed the independent film Blue Christmas, which was written by her older brother, Scott Getzinger. She also wrote and directed the short film Save Me in 2006.

Jennifer is the daughter of Mike Warren (né Warren Edwin Getzinger) (1933-2013), the creator and star of the Connecticut children's TV series The Friends of Mr. Goober, which was broadcast on WNHC-TV (now WTNH) Channel 8 in New Haven from 1961 to 1971. Warren also hosted Connecticut Bandstand on WNHC-TV in 1961 and later co-hosted the game show Dialing for Dollars on Channel 8 with Bob Norman. Warren died November 29, 2013, at age 80.

References

External links

1967 births
American television directors
American women film directors
American women television directors
Living people
Artists from New Haven, Connecticut
American script supervisors
Film directors from Connecticut
21st-century American women